KLRC (90.9 MHz) is a non-commercial FM radio station licensed to Tahlequah, Oklahoma.  It serves sections of Northwest Arkansas, Eastern Oklahoma and Southwest Missouri.  KLRC broadcasts a Christian adult contemporary radio format and is owned by John Brown University.  It is simulcast on KLAB at 101.1 MHz in Siloam Springs, Arkansas, as well as FM translators 99.1 K256BG in Bentonville, 101.1 K266BS in Van Buren and 103.5 K278BG in Springdale.  KLRC and KLAB use periodic on-air fundraisers to seek support from listeners for the running of the stations.

KLRC has an effective radiated power of 100,000 watts, the maximum for non-grandfathered FM stations.  The transmitter is on North 4670 Road in Dripping Springs, Oklahoma.   KLAB is powered at 7,700 watts, using a transmitter on West University Street in Siloam Springs.  The studios and offices are on North Broadway in Siloam Springs.

History
On October 1, 1983, KLRC signed on the air. It was a 115 watt station at 90.3 MHz, serving only the John Brown University (JBU) campus and surrounding community.  The station was housed in the "Cathedral of the Ozarks" on the JBU campus and carried Christian radio and classical music programs. Its primary purpose was to serve as a training ground for JBU broadcasting students.

In the fall of 1988, the Federal Communications Commission (FCC) approved an increase to 3,100 watts effective radiated power.  The FCC also changed the frequency of KLRC from 90.3 to 101.1 MHz.

KLRC continued to see steady growth through the early 1990s. The number of listeners increased, and the donations received during each on-air fundraiser grew as well. In January 1996, KLRC began broadcasting 24 hours a day. In 2000, the 60-year-old tower from which KLRC had been broadcasting was brought down as the station began broadcasting from a new tower and transmitter. And, in September of that year, KLRC debuted worldwide with its live internet stream.

In 2002, KLRC moved out of the Learning Resource Center and into its own building on the west end of the John Brown University campus, giving the station more room to expand.  By July 2005, KLRC was broadcasting 23 hours of locally generated music programming each weekday.  The station also added a new "Family Hour" each weeknight, comprising two family-oriented talk shows. The studios were moved again in the summer of 2011, this time to a building located off-campus in downtown Siloam Springs.

The station went from one full-time employee in 1996 to ten full-time and several part-time staff as of 2019.

In February 2013, KLRC launched a new 100,000 watt signal on 90.9 MHz.  The tower is located in Dripping Springs, Oklahoma, and the station is licensed to Tahlequah, Oklahoma. The station in Siloam Springs on the 101.1 FM frequency changed its call sign to KLAB.  The two stations simulcast the same programming, with additional FM translators added in three communities in Northeast Arkansas.

On-air staff
Mark Michaels and Keri Lynn are the station's morning hosts. Ansen Bayer and Kara Culver are heard in the afternoon. Isaac Weaver is the midday host, and Sean Sawatzky is heard in the evening.  Several part-time staff and John Brown University broadcasting students fill the remaining on-air roles.

Awards
KLRC has been named the Christian Music Broadcasters (CMB) "Small Market Radio Station of the Year" six times: in 2000, 2001, 2002, 2006, 2008, and 2016.  The National Association of Broadcasters (NAB) named KLRC the Marconi Award winner for Religious Station of the Year in 2013.

References

External links
90.9 KLRC Official Website

LRC
Radio stations established in 1983
1983 establishments in Arkansas
John Brown University
LRC